The 1965 British Sports Car Championship was the second season of the British Sports Car Championship.

Results
Races in bold, when also rounds of the World Championship for Makes.

References

British Sports Car Championship
Sports Car